Below is a list of dishes found in Korean cuisine.

Korean dishes by type

Royal court dishes

Gujeolpan (구절판): literally "nine-sectioned plate", this elaborate dish consists of a number of different vegetables and meats served with thin pancakes.  It is served usually at special occasions such as weddings, and is associated with royalty.
Sinseollo (신선로): An elaborate dish of meat and vegetables cooked in a rich broth.  It is served in a large silver vessel with a hole in the center, where hot embers are placed to keep the dish hot throughout the meal.

Grilled dishes

 Bulgogi (불고기) - thinly sliced or shredded beef marinated in soy sauce, sesame oil, garlic, sugar, scallions, and black pepper, cooked on a grill (sometimes at the table). Bulgogi literally means "fire meat." Variations include pork (dwaeji bulgogi, 돼지불고기), chicken (dak bulgogi 닭불고기), or squid (ojingeo bulgogi, 오징어불고기).
 Galbi (갈비) - pork or beef ribs, cooked on a metal plate over charcoal in the centre of the table. The meat is sliced thicker than bulgogi. It is often called "Korean barbecue" along with bulgogi, and can be seasoned or unseasoned.
 Dak galbi (닭갈비) - stir-fry marinated diced chicken in a gochujang-based sauce, and sliced cabbage, sweet potato, scallions, onions and tteok.
 Samgyeopsal (삼겹살) - unseasoned pork belly, served in the same fashion as galbi. Sometimes cooked on a grill with kimchi together at either side.  Commonly grilled with garlic and onions, dipped in sesame oil and salt mixture and wrapped with ssamjang in lettuce .
Makchang gui (막창구이) - grilled pork large intestines prepared like samgyeopsal and galbi, and often served with a light doenjang sauce and chopped scallions. It is very popular in Daegu and the surrounding Gyeongsang region.
Gobchang gui (곱창구이) - similar to makchang except prepared from the small intestines of pork (or ox)
Saengseon gui (생선구이) - grilled fish
Seokhwa gui or jogae gui (석화구이 or 조개구이) - grilled shellfish
Deodeok gui (더덕구이) - grilled deodeok (Codonopsis lanceolata; 더덕) roots
Beoseot gui (버섯구이) - any kind of grilled mushroom
Gim gui or guun gim (김구이 or 구운 김) - grilled dry laver (or gim)

Steamed dishes

 Galbijjim (갈비찜), made by braising marinated galbi (beef short rib) with diced potato and carrots in ganjang sauce
Andong jjimdak (찜닭), made by steaming chicken with vegetables and cellophane noodles in ganjang sauce.
 Agujjim (아귀찜), made by braising angler ( agui ) and mideodeok (미더덕 styela clava), and kongnamul (soybean sprouts)
 Jeonbokjjim (전복찜), made with abalone marinated in a mixture of ganjang (Korean soy sauce) and cheongju (rice wine)
 Gyeran jjim (계란찜), steamed egg custard, sometimes with (al)
 Oiseon (오이선), is a traditional Korean dish made from steamed cucumber with beefs and mushrooms
 Hobakjeon (호박전), pan-fried aehobak(Korean zucchini)
 Dubujeon (두부전), steamed tofu mixed with ground beef and vegetables

Raw dishes
 Sannakji (산낙지) or live octopus. Sannakji is served live and still moving on the plate.
 Yukhoe (육회), similar to beef tartare
 Sukhoe (숙회), parboiled fish, usually made with squid or octopus.
 Ganghoe (강회), a small roll of scallions, carrots and eggs made with scallions or garlic chives

Korean dishes by ingredient

Meat-based dishes

 Bulgogi (불고기): thinly sliced or shredded beef marinated in soy sauce, sesame oil, garlic, sugar, green onions and black pepper, cooked on a grill (sometimes at the table). Bulgogi literally means "fire meat". Variations include pork (Dweji bulgogi), chicken (Dak bulgogi), or squid (Ojingeo bulgogi).
 Dak galbi (닭갈비): Though galbi means ribs, this doesn't use the ribs of chicken.  Chunks of marinated chicken are stir-fried with vegetables and tteok (rice cake). Dakgalbi is a specialty of Chuncheon.
 Galbi (갈비): pork or beef ribs, cooked on a metal plate over charcoal in the centre of the table.  The meat is sliced thicker than bulgogi. It is often called "Korean BBQ", and can be seasoned or unseasoned.
 Samgyeopsal (삼겹살): Unseasoned pork belly, served in the same fashion as galbi.  Sometimes cooked on a grill with kimchee troughs at either side.  Commonly grilled with garlic and onions, dipped in ssamjjang and wrapped in lettuce leaves.
Makchang (막창): grilled pork or cow's 4th stomach prepared like samgyeopsal and galbi.  Often served with a light doenjang sauce and chopped green onions.  Very popular in Daegu and the surrounding Gyeongsang region.
Gobchang (곱창): similar to makchang except prepared from the small intestines of pork (or ox).
 Bossam (보쌈): a type of ssam in which steamed pork is wrapped in a leaf vegetable and accompanied by ssamjang
 Bbolsal: pork cheeks marinated in salt and sesame oil
 Yukgaejang (육개장): a spicy soup made from shredded beef and other ingredients.

Fish-based dishes
 Hoe (pronounced 'hweh') \hö\ (회): raw seafood dish dipped in gochujang or soy sauce with wasabi, served with lettuce or sesame leaves.
 Sannakji (산낙지), octopus. Sannakji is served freshly killed and remnant nerve impulses may allow it to still move on the plate. Less commonly, it may be served whole and still alive.

Vegetable-based dishes

Namul, seasoned vegetables
Saengchae (생채), made with shredded fresh vegetables and seasonings.
Oisaengchae (오이생채) - cucumber dressed in pepper powder, ground garlic, ground ginger root, sugar, vinegar, sesame oil or perillar oil. 
Doraji saengchae (도라지생채) - made with the roots of Chinese bellflower
Sukchae (숙채), cooked vegetables
Kongnamul (콩나물) - soybean sprouts, usually eaten in boiled and seasoned banchan. Soybean sprouts are also the main ingredient in kongnamul-bap (sprouts over rice), kongnamul-guk (sprout soup), and kongnamul-gukbap (rice in sprout soup).
Japchae (잡채) - vermicelli noodles cooked with stir-fried vegetables and small pieces of beef, which are cooked in a soy sauce mixture.

Soups and stews

Guk (국), soup
 Tteokguk (떡국), tteok (rice cake) soup
 Haejangguk (해장국): a favorite hangover cure consisting usually of meaty pork spine, dried ugeoji (우거지, dried outer leaves of Napa cabbage or other vegetables), coagulated ox blood (similar to blood pudding), and vegetables in a hearty beef broth.
 Miyeok guk (미역국), seaweed soup
Manduguk, dumpling soup
Tang (탕), stew
 Galbitang, a hearty soup made from short rib
 Oritang, a soup or stew made by slowly simmering duck and various vegetables.
 Samgyetang (삼계탕): a soup made with Cornish game hens that are stuffed with ginseng, hwanggi (황기, Astragalus propinquus), glutinous rice, jujubes, garlic, and chestnuts. The soup is traditionally eaten in the summer.
 Seolleongtang (설렁탕): A beef bone stock is simmered overnight then served with thinly sliced pieces of beef. Usually served in a bowl containing dangmyeon (당면, cellophane noodless) and pieces of beef. Sliced scallions and black pepper are used as condiments.
 Maeuntang (매운탕): a refreshing, hot and spicy fish soup.
 Gamjatang (감자탕, "pork spine stew" (literally means potato soup): a spicy soup made with pork spine, vegetables (especially potatoes) and hot peppers.  The vertebrae are usually separated.  This is often served as a late night snack but may also be served for a lunch or dinner.
 Daktoritang (닭도리탕) : A spicy chicken and potato stew.  Also known as Dakbokkeumtang (닭볶음탕).
 Chueotang (추어탕) ground Loach soup, where the loach boiled and ground to make smooth. The ground loach is mixed with several seasoning and vegetables, and then boiled once more.
 Bosintang (보신탕) : a soup made primarily with dog meat, boiled with vegetables and spices such as doenjang and gochujang. 
Jjigae (찌개), stew, formerly called "jochi" (조치) during the Joseon period
 Doenjang jjigae (된장찌개): or soybean paste soup, is typically served as the main course or served alongside a meat course. It contains a variety of vegetables, shellfish, tofu, and occasionally small mussels, shrimp or large anchovies. Usually, anchovies are used for preparing the base stock and are taken out before adding the main ingredients.
 Cheonggukjang jjigae (청국장찌개): a soup made from strong-smelling thick soybean paste containing whole beans
 Gochujang jjigae (고추장찌개): chili pepper paste soup
 Kimchi jjigae (김치찌개): A soup made with mainly kimchi, pork, and tofu. It is a common lunch meal or complement to a meat course. It is normally served in a stone pot, still boiling when it arrives at the table.
 Kongbiji jjigae: a stew made with ground soybeans.
 Sundubu jjigae (순두부찌개): a spicy stew made with soft tofu and shellfish. Traditionally, the diner puts a raw egg in it while it is still boiling.
 Saeujeot jjigae (새우젓찌개), jjigae made with saeujeot (fermented shrimp sauce)
 Budae jjigae (부대찌개, lit. "army base stew"): Soon after the Korean War, when meat was scarce, some people made use of surplus foods from US Army bases such as hot dogs and canned ham (such as Spam) and incorporated it into a traditional spicy soup.  This budae jjigae is still popular in South Korea, and the dish often incorporates more modern ingredients such as instant ramen noodles.
 Saengseon jjigae (생선찌개), fish stew
Jeongol (전골) : elaborate stew consisting of various ingredients. It is generally served on a burner.
Sinseollo, elaborate variety of jeongol once served in Korean royal court cuisine.
Gopchang jeongol, beef entrails and vegetable stew

Grain dishes

 Bibimbap (비빔밥, "mixed rice"): rice topped with seasoned vegetables such as spinach, mushrooms, sea tangle, carrots, bean sprouts, and served with a dollop of gochujang (red pepper paste), and variations often include beef or egg. Everything (seasonings, rice and vegetables) is stirred together in one large bowl and eaten with a spoon. One popular variation of this dish, dolsot bibimbap (돌솥 비빔밥), is served in a heated stone bowl, which permits the dish to continue cooking after it is served, and in which a raw egg is cooked against the sides of the bowl. Yukhoe bibimbap (육회비빔밥) is another variant of bibimbap, comprising raw beef strips with raw egg and a mixture of soy sauce with Asian pear and gochujang. Hoedeopbap (회덮밥) is another variation of bibimbap using a variety of cubed raw fish.
 Boribap (보리밥): Barley cooked rice
 Nurungji (누룽지): The crisp thin layer of rice left on the bottom of the pot when cooking rice which is eaten as a snack or can be made as a porridge.
 Ogokbap (오곡밥, five-grain rice): Usually a mixture of rice, red beans, black beans, millet, and sorghum, but can vary with glutinous rice and other grains in place of these.
 Patbap: rice with red beans
 Kongnamulbap: rice with bean sprouts kongnamul and sometimes pork
 Kimchi bokkeumbap: kimchi fried rice with typically chopped vegetables and meats

Banchan (side dishes)

 Kimchi (김치): vegetables (usually cabbage, Korean radish, or cucumber) commonly fermented in a brine of ginger, garlic, green onion and chilli pepper. There are endless varieties, and it is served as a side dish or cooked into soups and rice dishes. Koreans traditionally make enough kimchi to last for the entire winter season, although with refrigerators and commercial bottled kimchi this practice has become less common. Kimchi that is readily made is called Gutjaree(겉절이) and the one that is fermented for a long time and has more sour taste is called Shin-Kimchi(신김치). Moreover, different regions of Korea make Kimchi in different ways with different kinds of ingredients. For instance the lower southern part tends to make it taste more salty to preserve it longer. Some of the extra ingredients they use include squids, oysters and various other raw seafoods. Kimchi is often cited for its health benefits and has been included in Health magazine's "World's Healthiest Foods". Nonetheless, some research has found nitrate and salt levels in kimchi to be possible risk factors to gastric cancer although shellfish and fruit consumption were found to be protective factors to gastric cancer. Research has also found kimchi to be a preventive factor to stomach cancer.
Ggakdugi, radish kimchi
Baek kimchi, kimchi made without chili pepper
Mulkimchi, literally water kimchi
Nabak kimchi
Dongchimi
Pakimchi, scallion kimchi
Buchukimchi, Korean chive kimchi
Oisobakki, cucumber kimchi
Kkaetnip kimchi, perilla leaf kimchi
Chonggak kimchi, kimchi made with pony tail radish
 Namul
 Kongnamul (콩나물): Soybean sprouts, usually eaten in boiled and seasoned banchan. Soybean sprouts are also the main ingredient in kongnamul-bap (sprouts over rice), kongnamul-guk (sprout soup), and kongnamul-gukbap (rice in sprout soup).
 Chwinamul (취나물)
 Shigeunchi (시금치): lightly boiled spinach with a little bit of salt and ground garlic seasoning.
 Kohsarii (고사리): loyal fern that is usually seasonsed with soysauce.
 Hobaknamul (호박나물): Korean zucchini with baby shrimp called "Saewoojut (새우젓)." 
 Kongjaban (콩자반): black beans cooked in soysauce and sugar.
 Dureubnamul (두릅나물): angelica tree shoots that have been steamed and seasoned with soy sauce and sesame oil.
 Ggaennip (깻잎): perilla leaf that has been marinated with soysauce and sesame oil.
 Sanmaneul (산마늘): Alpine leek cooked with vinegar and sugar.

Guksu / noodles

 Naengmyeon (냉면, (North Korea: 랭면, Raengmyŏn), "cold noodles"): this dish (or originally winter dish) consists of several varieties of thin, hand-made buckwheat noodles, and is served in a large bowl with a tangy iced broth, raw julienned vegetables and fruit, and often a boiled egg and cold cooked beef.  This is also called Mul ("water") Naengmyeon, to distinguish Bibim Naengmyeon, which has no broth and is mixed with gochujang.
 Japchae (잡채): Boiled dangmyeon or potato noodles, steamed spinach, roasted julienned beef, roasted sliced onion, roasted julienned carrots are mixed with seasoning made of soy sauce, sesame oil and half-refined sugar.
 Jajangmyeon (자장면): A variation on a Chinese noodle dish that is extremely popular in Korea. It is made with a black bean sauce, usually with some sort of meat and a variety of vegetables including zucchini and potatoes. Usually ordered and delivered, like pizza.
 Kalguksu (칼국수): boiled flat noodles, usually in a broth made of anchovies and sliced zucchini.
 Sujebi (수제비)
 Makguksu (막국수), buckwheat noodles served in a chilled broth
 Jaengban guksu (쟁반국수)
 Bibim guksu (비빔국수), stirred noodles in a hot and spicy sauce
 Ramyeon (라면): spicy variation of noodle, usually eaten in the form of instant noodles or cup ramyeon.
 Janchi guksu (잔치국수): a light seaweed broth based noodle soup served with fresh condiments, usually kimchi, thinly sliced egg, green onions, and cucumbers.
 Geonjin guksu (건진국수)
 Jjapaguri (ram-don)

Snacks

Gimbap/Kimbap

Gimbap (literally, seaweed-rice, 김밥) is a very popular snack in Korea. It consists of cooked rice, sesame oil, salt, and sesame seeds, sugar is often added as seasonings. Then it is placed on a sheet of gim, dried laver. The seasoned rice is spread on the laver, and then fried egg, julienned carrots, julienned ham, seasoned ground beef or seasoned fish cakes, pickled radish, seasoned spinach, and seasoned gobo and cucumber are then placed closely together on the rice, and is rolled in the manner similar to that of the Japanese maki. Today, there are many varieties of gimbap: tuna, cheese, bulgogi, vegetable, and more.

Buchimgae

Buchimgae, also Korean pancake, in a narrower sense is a dish made by pan-frying in oil a thick batter with various ingredients into a thin flat pancake. In a wider sense it refers to food made by panfrying an ingredient soaked in egg or a batter mixed with various ingredients. In this case jeon, a dish made by seasoning whole, sliced, or minced fish, meat, vegetables, etc., and coating them with wheat flour and egg wash before frying them in oil, can be considered a type of buchimgae.

An aehobak can be used to make both buchimgae and jeon:
 Aehobakbuchimgae (애호박부침개): a type of buchimgae, made by seasoning julienned aehobak and mixing them with wheat flour and beaten egg, then pan-frying them in oil.
 Hobakjeon (호박전): a type of jeon, made by slicing aehobak thinly, egg-washing the slices, and pan-frying them in oil.

Buchimgaes and jeons taste best when dipped in a mixture of soy sauce, vinegar, and chili pepper powder. Popular dishes includes:
 Pajeon (파전): made by adding spring onions cut long, seafood, etc., into a flour dough, and pan-frying it
 Bindaetteok (빈대떡): made by grinding soaked mung beans, adding vegetables and meat and pan-frying it round and flat
 Kimchibuchimgae (김치부침개): made by frying a mixture of flour, water, and chopped kimchi
 Mineojeon (민어전 民魚煎), made with croaker
 Daegujeon (대구전 大口煎), made with Pacific cod
 Guljeon (굴전), made with oyster
 Yeongeunjeon (연근전), made with lotus root
 Gochujeon (고추전), made with chili peppers
 Dubujeon (두부전), made with tofu
 Pyogojeon (표고전), made with shiitake mushrooms and beef

Other snacks

Tteokbokki (떡볶이): a dish which is usually made with sliced rice cake, fish cakes and is flavored with gochujang.
Sundae (순대): Korean sausage made with a mixture of boiled sweet rice, oxen or pig's blood, potato noodle, mung bean sprouts, green onion and garlic stuffed in a natural casing.
Hotteok (호떡) : similar to pancakes, but the syrup is in the filling rather than a condiment. Melted brown sugar, honey, chopped peanuts and cinnamon are common fillings. Vegetables are sometimes added to the batter. Hotteok is usually eaten during cold winter months to "warm up" the body with the sweet and warm syrup in the pancake.
Hoppang (호빵)
Beondegi (번데기) : is steamed or boiled silkworm pupae which are seasoned and eaten as a snack.
Bungeoppang (붕어빵; "carp-bread") is the Korean name for the Japanese fish-shaped pastry Taiyaki that is usually filled with sweet red bean paste and then baked in a fish-shaped mold. It is very chewy on the inside and crispy on the outside. Gukwa-ppang (국화빵) is almost the same as bungeoppang, but it is shaped like a flower. Gyeran-ppang (계란빵, egg bread) has a shape of rounded rectangle and contains whole egg inside of a bread.  They are often sold by street vendors.  (See also taiyaki.)
 Gyeranppang (계란빵): a snack food prepared with egg and rice flour.

Anju (side dishes accompanying alcoholic beverages)

Anju (안주) is a general term for a Korean side dish consumed with alcohol (often with Korean soju). It is commonly served at bars, noraebang (karaoke) establishments, and restaurants that serve alcohol. These side dishes can also be ordered as appetizers or even a main dish. Some examples of anju include steamed squid with gochujang, assorted fruit, dubu kimchi (tofu with kimchi), peanuts, odeng/ohmuk, gimbap (small or large), samgagimbap (triangle-shaped gimbap like the Japanese onigiri), sora (소라 (a kind of shellfish popular in street food tents), and nakji (small octopus, as eaten on screen in the movie Oldboy). Soondae is also a kind of anju, as is samgyeopsal, or dwejigalbi. Most Korean foods may be served as anju, depending on availability and the diner's taste. However, anju are considered different from the banchan side dishes served with a regular Korean meal.
 Jokbal (족발): pig's feet served with a red salted shrimp sauce called saeujeot.

Desserts

 Tteok (떡): a chewy cake made from either pounded short-grain rice (메떡, metteok), pounded glutinous rice (찰떡, chaltteok), or glutinous rice left whole, without pounding (약식, yaksik).  It is served either cold (filled or covered with sweetened mung bean paste, red-bean paste, raisins, a sweetened filling made with sesame seeds, mashed red beans, sweet pumpkin, beans, dates, pine nuts or honey), usually served as dessert or snack. Sometimes cooked with thinly sliced beef, onions, oyster mushrooms, etc. to be served as a light meal.
 Songpyeon (송편): chewy stuffed tteok (rice cake) served at Chuseok (Mid-Autumn Festival) decorated with pine needle.  Honey or another soft sweet material, or red bean is found inside.
 Yaksik (약식) is a dessert made with glutinous rice, chestnuts, pine nuts, jujubes, and raw sugar and soy sauce and then steamed for seven to eight hours or until the mixture turns a blackish color.  some recipes call for topping the cooked mixture with persimmons.
 Chapssaltteok (찹쌀떡): a variety of tteok filled with sweet bean paste. Similar to Japanese mochi.

Beverages

 Makgeolli - Korean rice wine
Insam-cha (인삼차) - Korean ginseng tea
Saenggang-cha (생강차) - Tea made from ginger root.
Sujeonggwa (수정과) - dried persimmon punch
Sikhye (식혜) - sweet rice beverage
Yuja-cha (유자차) - Yuzu tea
Bori-cha (보리차) - roasted barley tea
Oksusu-cha (옥수수차) - roasted corn tea
Hyeonmi-cha (현미차) - roasted brown rice tea
Sungnyung (숭늉) - beverage made from the remainder of cooked, boiled, scorched rice removed from the cooking pot, mixed with water and boiled into a soup.
Yulmu-cha (율무차) - Coix lacryma-jobi var. ma-yuen tea
Gyeolmyeongja-cha (결명자차, 決明子茶) - made from roasted Senna obtusifolia seeds
Misutgaru (미숫가루) - several grains such as rice, barley, beans, glutinous rice, brown rice, Coix lacryma-jobi var. ma-yuen, etc. are roasted and then ground to be added to water.

See also
 List of North Korean dishes
 Korean baked goods

References

External links
 

Korean